Marie Rose Guiraud (10 September 1944 – 20 April 2020) was an Ivorian dancer and choreographer. She notably founded the École de danse et d'échange culturel, as well as the troupe Les Guirivoires.

References

1944 births
2020 deaths
Ivorian dancers
Ivorian choreographers
Women choreographers
Ivorian female dancers